Omorginae is a subfamily of beetles in the family Trogidae which includes extant species and extinct beetle species from the Lower Cretaceous. The subfamily contains the following genera:

Cretomorgus Nikolajev, 2007
Omorgus Erichson, 1847
Polynoncus Burmeister, 1876

References

Trogidae